Complaints of a Dutiful Daughter is a 1994 American documentary film directed by Deborah Hoffmann, with her wife, Frances Reid, as cinematographer. It was nominated for an Academy Award for Best Documentary Feature. The film is about the struggle of Doris Hoffman, mother of the director and widow of Albert Einstein's associate Banesh Hoffmann, with Alzheimer's disease.

Complaints of a Dutiful Daughter was aired on PBS as part of the series POV.

References

External links

Complaints of a Dutiful Daughter at Women Make Movies
Complaints of a Dutiful Daughter at POV

1994 short films
1994 films
1994 documentary films
American short documentary films
1990s short documentary films
1990s English-language films
1990s American films